Herbert Paul Varley (February 8, 1931 – December 15, 2015) was an American academic, historian, author, and Japanologist. He was an emeritus professor at Columbia University and Sen Sōshitsu XV Professor of Japanese Cultural History at the University of Hawaii.

Career

Among other interests, his research focused on the Kamakura period and Muromachi period in the history of Japan.

Selected works
In an overview of writings by and about Varley, OCLC/WorldCat lists roughly 38 works in 124 publications in 6 languages and 8,208 library holdings. 
This list is not finished; you can help Wikipedia by adding to it.
 1967 --  The Onin War; history of its origins and background with a selective translation of the Chronicle of Onin. New York: Columbia University Press. 
 1968 --  A Syllabus of Japanese Civilization. New York: Columbia University Press. 
 1971 -- Imperial Restoration in Medieval Japan. New York: Columbia University Press. ;  OCLC 142480
 1973 --  Japanese Culture: a Short History. New York: Prager.  OCLC  590531
 1980 --  A Chronicle of Gods and Sovereigns: Jinnō Shōtōki of Kitabatake Chikafusa. New York: Columbia University Press. 
 1994 --  Warriors of Japan as Portrayed in the War Tales. Honolulu: University of Hawaii Press. 
 2000—Japanese Culture. 4th Edition. Honolulu: University of Hawaii Press.

Honors
 Order of the Rising Sun, Gold Rays With Rosette, 1969.

Notes

References
 Mass, Jeffrey P. (1995).  Antiquity and Anachronism in Japanese History. Stanford: Stanford University Press.

External links
  Urasenke Konnichian website

1931 births
2017 deaths
Columbia University faculty
American Japanologists
Recipients of the Order of the Rising Sun, 4th class
American historians